In May 2010, a new taxonomy of the Bivalvia was published in the journal Malacologia. The 2010 taxonomy is known as the Taxonomy of the Bivalvia (Bouchet, Rocroi, Bieler, Carter & Coan, 2010). The 2010 taxonomy was published as Nomenclator of Bivalve Families with a Classification of Bivalve Families. This was a revised system for classifying bivalve mollusks such as clams, oysters, scallops, mussels and so on. In compiling this new taxonomy, the authors used a variety of phylogenetic information including molecular analysis, anatomical analysis, shell morphology and shell microstructure, as well as bio-geographic, paleobiogeographical and stratigraphic information.

In this classification, 324 families were recognized as valid. Of those, 214 are known exclusively as fossils. The remaining 110 families occur in the recent past, with or without a fossil record. This classification has since been adopted by WoRMS, the World Register of Marine Species.

The classification system
Classification of Class Bivalvia (under the redaction of Rüdiger Bieler, Joseph G. Carter and Eugene V. Coan) (all taxa marked † are extinct) :

Subclass, order, superfamily incertae sedis
Family †Archaeocarduudae
Family †Camyidae
Family †Cardiolariidae
Family †Cirravidae
Family †Fordillidae
Family †Laurskiidae
Family †Thoraliidae
Family †Tuarangiidae

Clade Heterodonta

Order and superfamily incertae sedis
Family †Anodontopsidae
Family †Baidiostracidae
Family †Carydiidae
Family †Intihuarellidae
Family †Lyrodesmatidae
Family †Montanariidae
Family †Nyassidae
Family †Pseudarcidae
Family †Redoniidae
Family †Tanaodontidae
Family †Zadimerodiidae

Order incertae sedis
Superfamily †Anthracosioidea
Family †Anthracosiidae
Family †Carbonicolidae
Family †Opokiellidae
Family Priukiellidae
Family †Shaanxiconchidae
Family †Sinomyidae
Superfamily Gastrochaenoidea
Family Gastrochaenidae
Superfamily Hiatelloidea
Family Hiatellidae
Superfamily †Kalenteroidea
Family †Kalenteridae
Superfamily †Modiomorphoidea
Family †Cypricardiniidae
Family †Hippopodiumidae
Family †Modiomorphidae
Family †Palaeopharidae
Family †Tusayanidae
Superfamily Solenoidea
Family Pharidae
Family Solenidae

Order †Actinodontida
Superfamily †Cycloconchoidea
Family †Actinodontidae
Family †Cycloconchidae

Order Carditida
 Superfamily incertae sedis
Family †Aenigmoconchidae
Family †Palaeocarditidae
Family Cardiniidae
Family †Myophoricardiidae
 Superfamily Carditoidea
Family Carditidae
Family Condylocardiidae
Superfamily Crassatelloidea
Family Astartidae
Family Crassatellidae
Family †Eodonidae
Family †Ptychomyidae

Order †Hippuritida
Superfamily †Radiolitoidea
Family †Antillocaprinidae
Family †Caprinidae
Family †Caprinulidae
Family †Caprotinidae
Family †Diceratidae
Family †Hippuritidae
Family †Ichthyosarcolitidae
Family †Monopleuridae
Family †Plagioptychidae
Family †Radiolitidae
Family †Techmanellidae
Superfamily †Requienioidea
Family †Epiceratidae
Family †Requieniidae

Order Lucinida
Superfamily †Babinkoidea
Family †Babinkidae
Family †Coxiconchiidae
Superfamily Lucinoidea
Family Lucinidae
Family †Mactromyidae
Family †Paracyclidae
Superfamily Thyasiroidea
Family Thyasiridae

Order Myida
Superfamily Myoidea
Family Corbulidae
Family Erodonidae
Family Myidae
Family †Pleurodesmatidae
Family †Raetomyidae
Superfamily Pholadoidea
Family Pholadidae
Family Teredinidae

Order †Orthonotida
Superfamily †Orthonotoidea
Family †Konduriidae
Family †Orthonotidae
Family †Prothyridae
Family †Solenomorphidae

Order Pholadomyida (=Anomalodesmata)
 Superfamily incertae sedis
Family †Ucumariidae
Superfamily Ceratomyoidea
Family †Ceratomyidae
Superfamily Clavagelloidea
Family Clavagellidae
Family Penicillidae
Superfamily †Edmondioidea
Family †Edmondiidae
Family †Pachydomidae
Superfamily Myochamoidea
Family Cleidothaeridae
Family Myochamidae
Superfamily Pandoroidea
Family Lyonsiidae
Family Pandoridae
Superfamily Pholadomyoidea
Family †Burmesiidae
Family †Ceratomyopsidae
Family †Grammysiidae
Family †Margaritariidae
Family Parilimyidae
Family Pholadomyidae
Family †Pleuromyidae
Family †Sanguinolitidae
Superfamily Thracioidea
Family Laternulidae
Family Periplomatidae
Family Thraciidae
Clade Septibranchia (within Pholadomyida)
Superfamily Cuspidarioidea
Family Cuspidariidae
Family Halonymphidae
Family Protocuspidariidae
Family Spheniopsidae
Superfamily Poromyoidea
Family Cetoconchidae
Family Poromyidae
Superfamily Verticordioidea
Family Euciroidae
Family Lyonsiellidae
Family Verticordiidae

Order Venerida
Superfamily incertae sedis
Family †Hemidonacidae
Superfamily Arcticoidea
Family Arcticidae
Family† Euloxidae
Family †Isocyprinidae
Family †Pollicidae
Family Trapezidae
Family †Veniellidae
Superfamily Cardioidea
Family Cardiidae
Superfamily Chamoidea
Family Chamidae
Superfamily Cyamioidea
Family Basterotiidae
Family Cyamiidae
Family Galatheavalvidae
Family Sportellidae
Superfamily Cyrenoidea
Family Cyrenidae
Family Glauconomidae
Superfamily Cyrenoidoidea
Family Cyrenoididae
Superfamily Dreissenoidea
Family Dreissenidae
Superfamily Gaimardioidea
Family Gaimardiidae
Superfamily Galeommatoidea
Family Galeommatidae
Family Lasaeidae
Superfamily Glossoidea
Family Glossidae
Family Kelliellidae
Family Vesicomyidae
Superfamily Mactroidea
Family Anatinellidae
Family Cardiliidae
Family Mactridae
Family Mesodesmatidae
Superfamily Sphaerioidea
Family †Ferganoconchidae
Family †Kijidae
Family †Limnocyrenidae
Family †Neomiodontidae
Family †Pseudocardiniidae
Family †Sibireconchidae
Family Sphaeriidae
Superfamily Tellinoidea
Family Donacidae
Family †Icanotiidae
Family Psammobiidae
Family †Quenstedtiidae
Family Semelidae
Family Solecurtidae
Family †Sowerbyidae
Family †Tancrediidae
Family Tellinidae
Family †Unicardiopsidae
Superfamily Ungulinoidea
Family Ungulinidae
Superfamily Veneroidea
Family Neoleptonidae
Family Veneridae

†"Megalodonts"
Family †Congeriomorphidae
Family †Dicerocardiidae
Family †Mecynodontidae
Family †Megalodontidae
Family †Pachyrismatidae
Family †Plethocardiidae
Family †Wallowaconchidae

Clade Palaeoheterodonta

Order Trigoniida
Superfamily †Beichuanioidea Liu & Gu, 1988
Family †Beichuaniidae Liu & Gu, 1988
Superfamily †Megatrigonioidea Van Hoepen, 1929
Family †Iotrigoniidae Savelive, 1958
Family †Megatrigoniidae Van Hoepen, 1929
Family †Rutitrigoniidae Van Hoepen, 1929
Superfamily Myophorelloidea Kobayashi, 1954
Family †Buchotrigoniidae Leanza, 1993
Family †Laevitrigoniidae Savelive, 1958
Family †Myophorellidae Kobayashi, 1954
Family †Vaugoniidae Kobayashi, 1954
Superfamily Trigonioidea Lamarck, 1819
Family †Eoschizodidae Newell & Boyd, 1975 (syn: Curtonotidae)
Family †Groeberellidae Pérez, Reyes, & Danborenea 1995
Family †Myophoriidae Bronn, 1849 (syn: Cytherodontidae, Costatoriidae, Gruenewaldiidae)
Family †Prosogyrotrigoniidae Kobayashi, 1954
Family †Scaphellinidae Newell & Ciriacks, 1962
Family †Schizodidae Newell & Boyd, 1975
Family †Sinodoridae Pojeta & Zhang, 1984
Family Trigoniidae Lamarck, 1819

Order Unionida
Superfamily †Archanodontoidea Modell, 1957 (placement in Unionoida uncertain)
Family †Archanodontidae Modell, 1957
Superfamily incertae sedis
Family †Desertellidae
Family †Trigonodidae
Family †Utschamiellidae
Superfamily Etherioidea Deshayes, 1832
Family Etheriidae Deshayes, 1832 (syn: Mulleriidae, Pseudomulleriidae)
Family Iridinidae Swainson, 1840 (syn: Mutelidae, Pleiodontidae)
Family Mycetopodidae Gray, 1840
Superfamily Hyrioidea Swainson, 1840
Family Hyriidae Swainson, 1840
Superfamily †Trigonioidoidea Cox, 1952
Family †Jilinoconchidae Ma, 1989 (placement uncertain)
Family †Nakamuranaiadidae Guo, 1981 (syn:Sinonaiinae, Nippononaiidae)
Family †Plicatounionidae Chen, 1988
Family †Pseudohyriidae Kobayashi, 1968
Family †Sainschandiidae Kolesnikov, 1977
Family †Trigonioididae Cox, 1952
Superfamily Unionoidea Rafinesque, 1820
Family Liaoningiidae Yu & Dong, 1993 (placement uncertain)
Family Margaritiferidae Henderson, 1929 (syn:Margaritaninae, Cumberlandiinae, Promargaritiferidae)
Family †Sancticarolitidae Simone & Mezzalira, 1997
Family Unionidae Rafinesque, 1820

Subclass Protobranchia

Order and superfamily incertae sedis
Family †Afghanodesmatidae
Family †Antactinodiontidae
Family †Ctenodontidae
Family †Eritropidae
Family †Pseudocryrtodontidae
Family †Tironuculidae

Order Nuculanida
Superfamily Nuculanoidea
Family Bathyspinulidae
Family †Cadomiidae
Family †Cucullellidae
Family †Isoarcidae
Family Malletiidae
Family Neilonellidae
Family Nuculanidae
Family †Palaeoneilidae
Family Phaseolidae (previously Lametilidae)
Family †Polydevciidae
Family Siliculidae
Family Tindariidae
Family Yoldiidae

Order Nuculida
Superfamily Nuculoidea
Family Nuculidae
Family †Nucularcidae
Family †Palaeoconchichidae
Family †Praenuculidae
Family Sareptidae

Order Solemyida
Superfamily Manzanelloidea
Family Manzanellidae
Superfamily Solemyoidea
Family Solemyidae

Subclass Autobranchia

Superorder, order and superfamily incertae sedis
Family †Cercomyidae
Family †Palaeocardiidae
Family †Pucamyidae

Superorder Heteroconchia

Order incertae sedis
Family †Amnigeniidae
Family †Lipanellidae
Family †Palaeomutelidae

Superorder Nepiomorphia

Order †Antipleurida
Superfamily †Dualinoidea
Family †Dualinidae
Family †Spanilidae
Family †Stolidotidae

Order †Praecardiida
Superfamily †Praecardioidea
Family †Buchiolidae
Family †Praecardiidae
Superfamily †Cardioloidea
Family †Cardiolidae
Family †Slavidae

Superorder Pteriomorphia

Order and superfamily incertae sedis
Family †Eligmidae
Family †Evyanidae
Family †Ischyrodontidae
Family †Limatulinidae
Family †Matheriidae
Family †Myodakryotidae
Family †Pichleridae
Family †Rhombopteriidae
Family †Umburridae

Order Arcida
Superfamily incertae sedis
Family †Catamarcaiidae
Superfamily Arcoidea
Family Arcidae
Family Cucullaeidae
Family Frejidae
Family Glycymerididae
Family Noetiidae
Family †Parallelodontidae
Superfamily Limopsoidea
Family Limopsidae
Family Philobryidae

Order Cyrtodontida
Superfamily †Cyrtodontoidea
Family †Cyrtodontidae
Family †Ptychodesmatidae
Superfamily †Falcatodontoidea
Family †Falcatodontidae

Order Limida
Superfamily Limoidea
Family Limidae

Order Mytilida
Superfamily †Modiolopsoidea
Family †Colpomyidae
Family †Modiolopsidae
Family †Saffordiidae
Superfamily Mytiloidea
Family †Mysideiellidae
Family Mytilidae

Order Ostreida
Superfamily Ostreoidea
Family †Arctostreidae
Family †Chondrodontidae
Family Gryphaeidae
Family Ostreidae

Order Pectinida
Superfamily incertae sedis
Family †Euchondriidae
Family †Praeostreidae
Family †Prospondylidae
Family †Saharopteriidae
Family †Vlastidae
Superfamily Anomioidea
Family Anomiidae
Family †Permanomiidae
Family Placunidae
Superfamily †Aulacomyelloidea
Family †Aulacomyellidae
Family †Bositridae
Superfamily †Aviculopectinoidea
Family †Aviculopectinidae
Family †Deltopectinidae
Superfamily †Buchioidea
Family †Buchiidae
Family †Eurydesmatidae
Superfamily †Chaenocardioidea
Family †Chaenocardiidae
Family †Binipectinidae
Family †Streblochondriidae
Superfamily Dimyoidea
Family Dimyidae
Superfamily †Heteropectinoidea
Family †Acanthopectinidae
Family †Annuliconchidae
Family †Heteropectinidae
Family †Limpectinidae
Superfamily †Halobioidea
Family †Claraiidae
Family †Daonellidae
Family †Halobiidae
Superfamily †Leiopectinoidea
Family †Leiopectinidae
Superfamily †Monotoidea
Family †Dolponellidae
Family †Monotidae
Superfamily †Oxytomoidea
Family †Otapiriidae
Family †Oxytomidae
Superfamily Pectinoidea
Family Entoliidae
Family †Entolioidesidae
Family †Neitheidae
Family Pectinidae
Family †Pernopectinidae
Family Propeamussiidae
Family Spondylidae
Family †Tosapectinidae
Superfamily Plicatuloidea
Family Plicatulidae
Superfamily †Pseudomonotoidea
Family †Hunanopectinidae
Family †Pseudomonotidae
Family †Terquemiidae
Superfamily †Pterinopectinoidea
Family †Natalissimidae
Family †Pterinopectinidae

Order Pteriida
Superfamily †Ambonychioidea
Family †Ambonychiidae
Family †Abiellidae
Family †Alatoconchidae
Family †Inoceramidae
Family †Kinerkaellidae
Family †Lunulacardiidae
Family †Lunulacardiidae
Family †Manticulidae
Family †Monopteriidae
Family †Myalinidae
Family †Prokopievskiidae
Family †Ramonalinidae
Superfamily Pinnoidea
Family Pinnidae
Superfamily Pterioidea
Family †Bakevelliidae
Family †Cassianellidae
Family †Isognomonidae
Family †Kochiidae
Family Malleidae
Family †Pergamidiidae
Family †Plicatosylidae
Family †Posidoniidae
Family †Pterineidae
Family Pteriidae
Family Pulvinitidae
Family †Retroceramidae

References

Bivalve taxonomy
Systems of animal taxonomy